4 Centauri is a star in the constellation Centaurus.  It is a blue-white B-type subgiant with an apparent magnitude of +4.75 and is approximately 640 light years from Earth.

4 Centauri is a hierarchical quadruple star system. The primary component of the system, 4 Centauri A, is a spectroscopic binary, meaning that its components cannot be resolved but periodic Doppler shifts in its spectrum show that it must be orbiting. 4 Centauri A has an orbital period of 6.927 days and an eccentricity of 0.23. Because light from only one of the stars can be detected (i.e. it is a single-lined spectroscopic binary), some parameters such as its inclination are unknown. The secondary component, is also a single-lined spectroscopic binary. It has an orbital period of 4.839 days and an eccentricity of 0.05. The secondary component is a metallic-lined A-type star. The two pairs themselves are separated by 14 arcseconds; one orbit would take at least 55,000 years.

References

Centaurus (constellation)
B-type subgiants
Centauri, h
Centauri, 4
Spectroscopic binaries
4
5221
120955
067786
Durchmusterung objects